Acanthovalva inconspicuaria is a species of moth in the family Geometridae. It is found in southern Europe, the Near East and throughout of Africa from Morocco to South Africa.

A known hostplant for the larvae of this species is Acacia nilotica.

References
Hübner, J. 1796–1838. Sammlung europäischer Schmetterlinge. - — :i–iv, 1–194.

Ennominae
Moths described in 1819
Moths of Africa
Moths of Europe